Holofernes was an Assyrian invading general of Nebuchadnezzar, who appears in the deuterocanonical Book of Judith.

Holofernes may also refer to:
 Holofernes (character), a schoolmaster in Shakespeare's Love's Labour's Lost
 Judith Holofernes (born 1976), German musician and lyricist

See also
 Judith and Holofernes (disambiguation)
 Pericopis holofernes, a synonym of the moth Dysschema terminata